George Neville Hill (26 February 1891 – 29 November 1944) was a New Zealand track and field athlete who competed as a member of the Australasian team in the 1912 Summer Olympics at Stockholm. Hill finished fourth in his heat of the 5000 metres and did not advance to the final. He did not finish in his heat of the 10000 metres.

References

External links
 
 

1891 births
1944 deaths
New Zealand male long-distance runners
Olympic athletes of New Zealand
Athletes (track and field) at the 1912 Summer Olympics
Olympic athletes of Australasia